New York’s 21st congressional district is a congressional district for the United States House of Representatives that is currently represented by Republican Elise Stefanik.

The district is rural and includes all of Clinton, Essex, Franklin, Fulton, Hamilton, Herkimer, Lewis, Montgomery, Schoharie, St. Lawrence, Warren, and Washington counties, and parts of Jefferson,  Otsego, and  Rensselaer counties. It includes the cities of Ogdensburg, Glens Falls, Plattsburgh, and Watertown. The district includes most of the Adirondack Mountains and the Thousand Islands region. It borders Vermont to the east and Canada to the north. It also includes Fort Drum of the U.S. Army.

From 2003 to 2013, the district with that number contained most of the Capital District of New York. It included all or parts of Albany, Fulton, Montgomery, Rensselaer, Saratoga, Schenectady, and Schoharie counties. It contained the cities of Albany, Schenectady, Troy, Amsterdam, Cohoes, Watervliet, Gloversville, and Johnstown. Up until 1980, the 21st district was located in Upper Manhattan (including parts of Harlem and Washington Heights), and The Bronx.

Voting

List of members representing the district

1813–1821: Two seats
From the creation of the district in 1813 to 1821, two seats were apportioned, elected at-large on a general ticket.

1821–present: One seat

Recent election results
In New York State electoral politics there are numerous minor parties at various points on the political spectrum. Certain parties will invariably endorse either the Republican or Democratic candidate for every office, hence the state electoral results contain both the party votes, and the final candidate votes (Listed as "Recap").

See also

List of United States congressional districts
 New York's congressional districts
 United States congressional delegations from New York

References

Inline references

Bibliography
 
 
 Congressional Biographical Directory of the United States 1774–present
 OpenSecrets.org-21st Congressional District candidates 2008 campaign contributions for each candidate
 2014 election data
 2012 election data
 2010 election data
 2004 House election data Clerk of the House of Representatives
 2002 House election data Clerk of the House of Representatives
 2000 House election data Clerk of the House of Representatives
 1998 House election data Clerk of the House of Representatives
 1996 House election data Clerk of the House of Representatives

21
1813 establishments in New York (state)
Constituencies established in 1813